The Domuyo Volcano is a stratovolcano located in the Argentine province of Neuquén. 

At least 14 dacite lava domes are found within the caldera, with another five outside. Its slopes western contain many fumaroles, hot springs and geysers.

It names derives from the Mapuche meaning "To tremble and grumble", probably due to the geothermal activity of the volcano.

The volcano is accessible by the National Route 40 from Chos Malal, connecting with provincial route 43, passing by Andacollo.

See also
List of volcanoes in Argentina

References

Sources 
  (in Spanish; also includes volcanoes of Argentina, Bolivia, and Peru)
 

Subduction volcanoes
Volcanoes of Neuquén Province
Stratovolcanoes of Argentina
Calderas of Argentina
Pleistocene stratovolcanoes